Sidney Rochell Lowe (born January 21, 1960) is an American former basketball player and coach. He is currently an assistant coach for the Cleveland Cavaliers of the National Basketball Association (NBA). Lowe played college basketball and served as the head coach at North Carolina State University (NC State).

Biography

Lowe began his career at DeMatha Catholic High School in Hyattsville, Maryland. He played collegiate basketball at NC State. He was the point guard for the Wolfpack's 1983 NCAA National Championship. Lowe was selected by the Chicago Bulls with the 1st pick of the second round in the 1983 NBA Draft.  He played a total of four seasons in the NBA, for five different teams.

After retiring from basketball in 1991, Lowe took a job as an assistant coach with the Minnesota Timberwolves.  Halfway through the 1992–93 season he took over as head coach of the struggling Timberwolves and remained in that position until the end of the 1993–94 season.  From 1994 to 1999, Lowe served as an assistant coach to Mike Fratello with the Cleveland Cavaliers.  Lowe returned to the Timberwolves organization in 1999 for one season as assistant coach.

The 2000–01 NBA season became Lowe's second stint as a head coach when he assumed the role for the Vancouver Grizzlies. He was the fifth head coach in the team's short history and led them to a franchise-best record of 23–59 in his first season and again the following season in 2001–02, when the Grizzlies relocated to Memphis. Sidney Lowe resigned from his coaching duties early in the 2002–03 season after starting 0–8, leaving his head coaching record at 79 wins against 228 losses (.257 winning percentage).  In 2003, he returned to Minnesota once again to take an assistant position under then head coach Flip Saunders. Lowe followed Saunders to the Detroit Pistons in 2005 and remained an assistant coach there through the 2006 season.

To become eligible for employment as an NCAA head coach, he completed the final nine hours of his business administration degree online via St. Paul's College in Lawrenceville, Virginia.  On May 6, 2006, Lowe was named the new head basketball coach of North Carolina State University, replacing Herb Sendek. Lowe was the first African American named head coach of the Wolfpack.  One of Lowe's trademarks as a coach was a red blazer he wore to significant games in honor of his former NC State coach, Jim Valvano.

In his first season at the helm of the NC State program, Lowe became just the third Wolfpack coach, after Everett Case and Press Maravich, to win 20 games and defeat the other three North Carolina institutions in the ACC (Duke, North Carolina and Wake Forest).  He is one of only four NC State coaches to have coached in the ACC Championship game in their first year.

In spite of the early success, Lowe failed to lead NC State to the NCAA tournament, and his teams only made two appearances in the NIT. He had an overall winning record (86–78) after five years but only a 25–55 conference record. Lowe resigned as head coach of NC State, accepting a buyout of the last two years of his contract, on March 15, 2011. Later that year, he joined the Utah Jazz as an assistant.

At the beginning of the 2014–15 season, Lowe rejoined the Minnesota Timberwolves as an assistant for the next two years, being fired at the end of the 2015–16 season. On July 5, 2016, the Washington Wizards announced that Lowe had been hired as an assistant coach. Lowe was hired by the Detroit Pistons beginning the 2018–19 season.

Personal life
In 1984, Lowe married Melonie Moultry in Winston-Salem, North Carolina. He had 20 groomsmen including Lorenzo Charles, Thurl Bailey, Dereck Whittenburg, Cozell McQueen and Clyde Austin.

NBA playing career

Regular season

|-
| style="text-align:left;"|
| style="text-align:left;"|Indiana
| 78 || 2 || 15.9 || .413 || .111 || .777 || 1.6 || 3.4 || 1.2 || .1 || 4.2
|-
| style="text-align:left;"|
| style="text-align:left;"|Detroit
| 6 || 0 || 5.2 || .286 ||  ||  || .2 || 1.3 || .0 || .0 || .7
|-
| style="text-align:left;"|
| style="text-align:left;"|Atlanta
| 15 || 0 || 10.6 || .400 || .000 || 1.000 || 1.0 || 2.8 || .7 || .0 || 1.6
|-
| style="text-align:left;"|
| style="text-align:left;"|Charlotte
| 14 || 0 || 17.9 || .320 || .000 || .636 || 2.4 || 6.6 || 1.0 || .0 || 1.6
|-
| style="text-align:left;"|
| style="text-align:left;"|Minnesota
| 80 || 38 || 21.8 || .319 || .222 || .722 || 2.0 || 4.2 || .9 || .1 || 2.3
|- class="sortbottom"
| style="text-align:center;" colspan="2"|Career
| 193 || 40 || 17.7|| .367 || .133 || .764 || 1.7 || 3.9 || 1.0 || .0 || 2.9

Head coaching record

NBA

|-
| style="text-align:left;"|Minnesota
| style="text-align:left;"|
|53||13||40|||| align="center"|5th in Midwest|||—||—||—||—
| style="text-align:center;"|Missed playoffs
|-
| style="text-align:left;"|Minnesota
| style="text-align:left;"|
|82||20||62|||| align="center"|5th in Midwest|||—||—||—||—
| style="text-align:center;"|Missed playoffs
|-
| style="text-align:left;"|Vancouver
| style="text-align:left;"|
|82||23||59|||| align="center"|7th in Midwest|||—||—||—||—
| style="text-align:center;"|Missed playoffs
|-
| style="text-align:left;"|Memphis
| style="text-align:left;"|
|82||23||59|||| align="center"|7th in Midwest|||—||—||—||—
| style="text-align:center;"|Missed playoffs
|-
| style="text-align:left;"|Memphis
| style="text-align:left;"|
|8||0||8|||| align="center"|(resigned)|||—||—||—||—
| style="text-align:center;"|—
|- class="sortbottom"
| style="text-align:left;"|Career
| ||307||79||228|||| ||—||—||—||—||

College

References

External links

 Coaching statistics at Basketball-Reference.com
 SidneyLowe.com: Sidney Lowe

Living people
1960 births
African-American basketball coaches
African-American basketball players
Albany Patroons players
American expatriate basketball people in Canada
American men's basketball coaches
American men's basketball players
American television sports announcers
Basketball coaches from Washington, D.C.
Basketball players from Washington, D.C.
Charlotte Hornets players
Chicago Bulls draft picks
Cleveland Cavaliers assistant coaches
College men's basketball head coaches in the United States
DeMatha Catholic High School alumni
Detroit Pistons assistant coaches
Detroit Pistons players
Indiana Pacers players
McDonald's High School All-Americans
Memphis Grizzlies head coaches
Minnesota Timberwolves assistant coaches
Minnesota Timberwolves announcers
Minnesota Timberwolves head coaches
Minnesota Timberwolves players
NC State Wolfpack men's basketball coaches
NC State Wolfpack men's basketball players
Point guards
Rapid City Thrillers players
Saint Paul's College (Virginia) alumni
Tampa Bay Thrillers players
Utah Jazz assistant coaches
Vancouver Grizzlies head coaches
Washington Wizards assistant coaches